Fugly! is a 2014 American comedy film directed by Alfredo De Villa and written by Kathy DeMarco and John Leguizamo. The film stars John Leguizamo, Radha Mitchell, Rosie Perez, Griffin Dunne, Yul Vazquez and Ally Sheedy. The film was released on 5 November 2014, by 108 Media and Paladin.

Plot
Jesse is an unattractive man rejected by women because of his donkey-faced appearance. Jesse's life is comically chronicled while his existence becomes increasingly unbearable.

Cast
John Leguizamo as Jesse
Radha Mitchell as Lara
Rosie Perez as Zowie
Griffin Dunne as Jefferey
Yul Vazquez as Ray
Ally Sheedy as Stoddard
Tomas Milian as Gramps
Olga Merediz as Moms
Steven R. Kaufman as ER Doctor

References

External links
 
 

2014 films
2014 comedy films
American comedy films
Films directed by Alfredo De Villa
2010s English-language films
2010s American films